Uladzimir Mikalayevich Malyshaw (born 22 August 1969) is a Belarusian football coach and a former player. He is an assistant manager with FC Kazanka Moscow.

References

1969 births
Living people
Soviet footballers
Belarusian footballers
Belarusian expatriate footballers
Expatriate footballers in Russia
Expatriate footballers in Estonia
Expatriate footballers in Latvia
FC Lada-Tolyatti players
FC Molodechno players
FC Lantana Tallinn players
FC Neman Grodno players
FK Liepājas Metalurgs players
Belarusian football managers
Belarusian expatriate football managers
Expatriate football managers in Russia
Association football goalkeepers
Meistriliiga players
Belarusian expatriate sportspeople in Estonia
Belarusian expatriate sportspeople in Latvia
Belarusian expatriate sportspeople in Russia